General elections were held in Cuba on 14 July 1940. Fulgencio Batista won the presidential election running under the People's Socialist Coalition banner, whilst the Partido Auténtico emerged as the largest party in the House of Representatives. Voter turnout was 73.4%.

Results

President

Senate

House of Representatives

References

Cuba
General
Presidential elections in Cuba
Parliamentary elections in Cuba
Cuba
Election and referendum articles with incomplete results